Sarro may refer to:

 Sarro, Mali, a village in Mali
 Sarró, the sack of the Majorcan bagpipe Xeremia
 Sarangani Reconciliation and Reformation Organization (SARRO), a regional political party in the Philippines

People
 Domenico Sarro (1679–1744), Italian composer
 Fred DeSarro (1937–1978), American racecar driver
 Al Di Sarro (1951–2011), American visual effects artist
 Joseph DiSarro, American professor of political science
 Dimitrios Sarros (1869/70–1937), Greek scholar, teacher, soldier

See also
 Saro (disambiguation)
 Sarroux, a former commune in Corrèze department, France